This is a timeline of artists, albums, and events in progressive rock and its subgenres.  This article contains the timeline for the period 1990 - 1999.

Contents
1990 - 1991 - 1992 - 1993 - 1994 - 1995 - 1996 - 1997 - 1998 - 1999

 See also
 Links and references


1990

Newly formed bands 
 Amorphis
 Ark
 Big Big Train
 Opeth
 Tool
Ulysses

Albums

Disbandments

Events 
 Rick Wright is made a full member of Pink Floyd again, after being fired by Roger Waters in 1980 but remaining as a paid session musician until the end of the 1987-1989 world tours in support of A Momentary Lapse of Reason.

1991

Newly formed bands

Albums

Disbandments
 Keep the Dog

Events
 Yes becomes composed of an eight-man supergroup constituted by members from Yes (Squire, Rabin, White, Kaye & Anderson) and Anderson Bruford Wakeman Howe. The band undertakes a world tour lasting into 1992.
 Freddie Mercury (Queen) dies from complications of AIDS.
 IQ - Peter Nicholls (vocals) formally re-joins. Bass player John Jowitt replaces Les Marshall.
 Kevin "James" Labrie is hired as new vocalist for Dream Theater

1992

Newly formed bands 
 Sirrah
 Spock's Beard

Reformed bands 
 Emerson, Lake & Palmer
 Gong

Albums

Disbandments

Events
 The Yes Union tour ends. Yes reverts to the 1980s lineup (Anderson, Squire, Kaye, Rabin & White).

1993

Newly formed bands 
 Kasandrin Glas
 Moongarden
 Neverne Bebe
 Paley's Watch (project of Marc Catley, lately of Marc Catley/Geoff Mann collaborations)

Albums

Disbandments

Events
 Frank Zappa dies of prostate cancer.

1994

Newly formed bands 
 Eyefear
 Little Tragedies
 Portal
 Symphony X
 Ved Buens Ende

Albums

Disbandments
 Änglagård
 Pink Floyd

Events
 King Crimson reforms as a sextet.
 Pink Floyd goes on single largest tour the band has ever done.  The tour is a hit, grossing a record US$300 million. It also marks the first time since 1975 the band plays The Dark Side of the Moon live in its entirety.
 The "90125" era Yes releases Talk on Victory Records. Though plans had been worked on to include possibly Steve Howe and Rick Wakeman, Victory president Phil Carson insists on signing only Anderson, Squire, Rabin, White, and Kaye. Talk marks the last album of this version of Yes.
 Dream Theater keyboardist Kevin Moore leaves the band to pursue a solo career. His replacement is former Alice Cooper and KISS keyboardist Derek Sherinian.

1995

Newly formed bands 
 The Flower Kings

Albums

Disbandments

Events
 Tony Kaye retires from Yes while Trevor Rabin leaves the band to concentrate on soundtrack production. Steve Howe and Rick Wakeman rejoin Yes in what fans and critics alike call the reformation of "Classic Yes."
 Paul D'Amour leaves Tool. Justin Chancellor, of the band Peach, comes on board during the recording of their next album as their new bassist.
 Russell Allen joins Symphony X replacing Rod Tyler on vocals.

1996

Newly formed bands 
 Mostly Autumn (England)
 Mudvayne (US)
 Traindodge (US)
 Gojira (France)

Albums

Disbandments
 Paley's Watch

Events
 Rick Davies reforms Supertramp.
 Phil Collins leaves Genesis.
 Pink Floyd get inducted into the Rock and Roll Hall of Fame.

1997

Newly formed bands

Albums

Disbandments
 Kasandrin Glas

Events
 Citing difficulties in agreements over management, Rick Wakeman again departs Yes. Longtime band affiliate Billy Sherwood joins as a full member. Keyboardist Igor Khoroshev also joins.
 X Japan - They officially disbanded on December 31 after their live performance held on the same day.
 Chris DeGarmo leaves Queensrÿche.
 Mario Mutis Rejoined Los Jaivas.

1998

Newly formed bands 
 Cog
 Fair To Midland
 Muse
 Nurkostam
 Oceansize
 Olive Mess
 Sylvan
 Thirty Seconds to Mars
 Thy Catafalque

Albums

Disbandments
 Boud Deun
 Emerson, Lake & Palmer
 Genesis
 Conception
 Rush (temporarily) - After the death of his daughter and wife within a year of each other, drummer Neil Peart was quoted in an interview as being "certain that I would never play drums or write lyrics or a book again." He would eventually rediscover his love for drums and reform Rush in 2001.

Events
 Barclay James Harvest announces an extended sabbatical in which the band members would pursue separate projects, which marked the end of the original group.
 Thomas Miller leaves Symphony X.

1999

Newly formed bands

Albums

Disbandments

Events
 First annual North East Art Rock Festival (NEARfest), Bethlehem, PA (US)
 Dream Theater replaces keyboardist Derek Sherinian with Jordan Rudess (ex-Dixie Dregs) after the success of the side-project Liquid Tension Experiment. Admitting that Dream Theater's decision was ultimately a favor, Sherinian goes on to establish a solo career and the band Planet X with drummer Virgil Donati.

See also
 Timeline of progressive rock: other decades: 1960s - 1970s - 1980s - 2000s - 2010s – 2020s
 Timeline of progressive rock (Parent article)
 Progressive rock
 Canterbury Scene
 Symphonic rock
 Avant-rock
 Rock in Opposition
 Neo-prog
 Progressive metal
 Jazz fusion

References

Further reading
 Lucky, Jerry.  The Progressive Rock Files Burlington, Ontario: Collector's Guide Publishing, Inc (1998), 304 pages,  (paperback).  Gives an overview of progressive rock's history as well as histories of the major and underground bands in the genre.
 Macan, Edward.  Rocking the Classics:  English Progressive Rock and the Counterculture. Oxford:  Oxford University Press (1997), 290 pages,  (hardcover),  (paperback).  Analyzes progressive rock using classical musicology and also sociology.

Timeline
Progressive rock
Timeline of progressive rock
1990s in music
Music history by genre
Progressive rock